Section 213 of the Norwegian Penal Code was a provision of the Norwegian Penal Code that defined sexual intercourse between men as well as between people and animals as a crime. The section was repealed on April 21, 1972. It was, among other things, the sodomy law of Norway.

The provision read:
If indecent intercourse occurs between male persons, those, who have committed or have been accessory to such intercourse, are liable to a term of imprisonment up to 1 year.

Any person, who conducts indecent intercourse with animals, or is accessory to such intercourse, is liable to the same sentence as defined above.

Indictment will only be conducted when necessary by public consideration.

From 1989 to 2000, section 213 defined sexual intercourse.

Zoophilia is prohibited by the 2009 Act on Protection of Animals (dyrevelferdsloven).

Formal apologies

In April 2022 on the 50th anniversary, the government of Norway made formal apologies to all victims of the ban on gay sex between men - which was repealed in 1972.

See also

LGBT rights in Norway

References

Criminalization of homosexuality
LGBT in Norway
LGBT-related legislation